La Queue-les-Yvelines (official spelling) (written as La Queue-lez-Yvelines by municipality) is a commune in the Yvelines department in the Île-de-France region in north-central France.

People
Louise de Maisonblanche, Baroness of La Queue, illegitimate daughter of Louis XIV of France and Claude de Vin des Œillets died here in 1718.

See also
Communes of the Yvelines department

References

Communes of Yvelines